The ureteral branches of renal artery are small branches which supply the ureter.

References

Arteries of the abdomen